Oliva athenia is a species of sea snail, a marine gastropod mollusk in the family Olividae, the olives.

Description

Distribution
This species occurs in the China seas.

References

 Vervaet F.L.J. (2018). The living Olividae species as described by Pierre-Louis Duclos. Vita Malacologica. 17: 1-111
 Tursch, B. & Greifeneder, D., 2001 - Oliva shells. The genus Oliva and the species problem, p. 569 pp

athenia
Gastropods described in 1840